Shep's Race with Death is a 1914 American short silent drama film, directed by Jack Harvey for the Thanhouser Company. It stars Shep the Dog, Mrs. Whitcove, and J.S. Murray. The film about a "collie dog [who] wins a race with death, saves the life of his mistress, and causes a happy family reunion", was released on November 1, 1914.

Cast
Shep the Dog as himself
Mrs. Whitcove as Mrs. Mateland
J.S. Murray as Mr. Stearns
Marie Rainford as Mrs. Stearns
Marion Fairbanks as a twin
Madeline Fairbanks as a twin

Reception
Released in November 1914, a month after A Dog's Love, the picture was less well-received than Harvey's debut film. The Bioscope wrote on February 11, 1915: "A somewhat tepid and not very convincing story of a dog which saves a little girl's life and thereby brings her parents together again. Very prettily acted, but the plot is very artificial and conventional." However, The Moving Picture World wrote on November 14, 1914: "The mother-in-law's appearance temporarily wrecks the home of the girl twins, the mother and father separating, each taking a child. The events which bring the family together again are very stirring and full of anxious suspense. The big dog, Shep, pulls the runaway horse off the railroad track, where it had stopped, thus saving the life of one twin. This is well-pictured and very entertaining."

References

External links

Shep's Race with Death at the Internet Movie Database

1914 films
American silent short films
Silent American drama films
1914 drama films
Films directed by Jack Harvey
Thanhouser Company films
1914 short films
American black-and-white films
1910s American films